Curllsville is an unincorporated community in Clarion County, Pennsylvania, United States. Curllsville has a post office with ZIP code 16221.

Notes

Unincorporated communities in Clarion County, Pennsylvania
Unincorporated communities in Pennsylvania